The Detroit Tigers' 1989 season was a season in American baseball. The Tigers finished 59–103 and in last place in the AL East. It was the team's first losing season since 1977, the worst record in the Major Leagues, as well as (at the time) the franchise's second-worst season ever in terms of both losses (103) and win percentage (.364). It was also (at the time) the franchise's worst full 162-game season (those marks would be surpassed in 1996, 2003, and 2019).

Offseason Roster Moves at a glance
 October 28, 1988: Walt Terrell was traded by the Tigers to the San Diego Padres for Chris Brown (baseball) and Keith Moreland.
 November 4, 1988: Darrell Evans was granted free agency. Larry Herndon was released by the Detroit Tigers.
 November 16, 1988: Ray Knight was released by the Tigers.
 November 30, 1988: Randy Bockus was signed as a free agent with the Detroit Tigers.
 January 13, 1989: Doyle Alexander was signed as a free agent by the Tigers.
 February 22, 1989: Mark Huismann was released by the Tigers.
 March 23, 1989: Tom Brookens was traded by the Tigers to the New York Yankees for Charles Hudson.
 March 23, 1989: Eric King was traded by the Tigers to the Chicago White Sox for Kenny Williams.

Spring Training

March 1: Manager Sparky Anderson confirms his intention to bat veteran second baseman Lou Whitaker third in the batting lineup for the upcoming season.

March 3: The Tigers win their first Spring Training game a 6-4 victory over the Chicago White Sox. Matt Nokes and Torey Lovullo both homer, in support of victor Eric King, who pitched three innings of relief. Jack Morris started and allowed one-hit over three innings and Guillermo Hernandez earned the save.

March 4: Shortstop Alan Trammell signs the richest contract in team history, a three-year, $6.4 million deal. Trammell negotiated the deal with General Manager Bill Lajoie without the help of an agent.

March 12:   The first telecast of the 1989 season came on Sunday, March 12 when the Tigers played the Texas Rangers at Joker Marchant Stadium in Lakeland. George Kell and Al Kaline were the announcers. WDIV had changed their opening graphics and music with this airing and discontinued referring to the year in their opening graphics. Instead of following the previous pattern calling the broadcast "Tigers '89," they were now designated as "Tiger Baseball Network."

March 15: Despite losing to the Texas Rangers and Nolan Ryan 4-1, a confident manager Sparky Anderson tells the media, “If we stay healthy, we can win it. We’re going to be good. We’ll be in the thick of things. They’re picking us for fifth again. That’ll be enough to let me look smart.” 

March 16: Owner Tom Monaghan announces his support for a new open-air stadium that would remain in Detroit. A consulting firm based in Kansas City, Missouri, provided several options, also including renovations of Tiger Stadium and a new retractable dome option.

March 21: Centerfielder Gary Pettis jammed his thumb trying to steal second during the Tigers’ 6-3 victory over the Boston Red Sox. Pettis, who was also slated to start the season as the Tigers’ leadoff hitter, would go on to miss the first month and a half with the injury.

March 23:   The Tigers make three separate trades with the stated goal to address an aging roster. Long-time fan favorite Tom Brookens is traded to the New York Yankees for pitcher Charles Hudson. Brookens, 35, and his teammates were surprised by the trade and was quoted as saying the he “spent more time in limbo than some dancers.”  Teammate Jack Morris was incensed, telling the media “they (Tiger management) talk about loyalty. They crapped on Tommy for nine years, then they trade him.” Alan Trammell was more philosophical saying, “I thought in the back of my mind he’d be a Tiger all his life. That’s gone now.”

The other trades saw pitcher Eric King traded to the Chicago White Sox for outfielder Kenny Williams and utility player Luis Salazar traded to the San Diego Padres for infielder Mike Brumley. King, 24, apparently, was in Tiger manager Sparky Anderson’s doghouse for a subpar 1988 season, despite pitching very well during spring training (3-0, 1.96 ERA).  King was quoted as saying “Obviously, I made someone mad in this organization and I couldn’t change it.” 

Anderson claimed at the time that Williams, 25 was “key” despite hitting .147 during spring training at the time of the trade.  Salazar, 33,  had a strong first half of the 1988 season with Detroit, and played seven different positions, but Brumley, 25, was considered a younger switch-hitting version.

General Manager Bill Lajoie said the trade “gives us some added speed and also adds youth to the roster. We'll now start the season with a balanced club. Williams and Brumley are every scout’s dream. They're young players with tools.”

March 27:   In a surprise announcement, Torey Lovullo is named the Opening Day first baseman by manager Sparky Anderson. Lovullo, a 24-year old switch hitting rookie, wins the job due his versatility (he plays all four infield positions in Spring Training) and a prolonged slump by veteran Keith Moreland, who was expected to be the first baseman after being traded for Walt Terrell. When Spring Training began, the general consensus was the Tiger roster was set. This announcement, along with Anderson’s insistence that Lovullo was  “the new heart of the lineup” and get 500 at-bats in the upcoming season was newsworthy.

Veteran outfielder Dwayne Murphy was released. With the acquisition of Kenny Williams and a strong spring showing by the younger Billy Bean, the 34-year old Murphy was expendable, despite hitting .300 in Spring Training.

March 31:  The Tigers announce their Opening Day roster:

Pitchers: Doyle Alexander, Dave Beard, Paul Gibson, Mike Henneman, Guillermo Hernandez, Charles Hudson, Jack Morris, Jeff Robinson, Frank Tanana, Frank Williams

Catchers: Mike Heath, Matt Nokes

Infielders: Billy Bean, Dave Bergman, Chris Brown, Mike Brumley, Torey Lovullo, Keith Moreland, Al Pedrique, Alan Trammell, Lou Whitaker

Outfielders: Chet Lemon, Fred Lynn, Pat Sheridan, Ken Williams

April 1: The Tigers defeat the Boston Red Sox 4-2 in Lakeland to finish the Grapefruit League season 15-16-1.

Regular season

April 
April 4: Before the largest Opening Day crowd in Texas Rangers’ history, the Tigers are shutout by Charlie Hough 4-0. The Tigers never really get their offense going, collecting only five hits. It is the first time the Tigers are shut out on Opening Day since 1975. Chet Lemon has the first hit of the Tigers’ season and Jack Morris takes the loss. Morris tied the American League record with his tenth consecutive Opening Day start. He would go on to set the Major League record with 14 straight Opening Day assignments, breaking the record of Robin Roberts of the Philadelphia Phillies.

Before the game, the first pitch is delivered by recently-fired Dallas Cowboys coach Tom Landry. Landry is joined by the new ownership of the Rangers, headed by George W. Bush.

May 
May 11:   The Tigers travel to Toledo, Ohio for an exhibition game against their AAA minor-league affiliate the Toledo Mud Hens. The Mud Hens defeated the Tigers 3-1 before 10,322 at Ned Skeldon Stadium. Former Tiger and Mud Hen manager John Wockenfuss pitches five scoreless innings in relief allowing just three hits. The 40-year old Wockenfuss was primarily a catcher in his 12-year major league career and took to the mound because the Mud Hens were coming off a doubleheader the day before and had another one scheduled the following day. This game further highlighted the Tigers worst start in 35 years.

May 19:    Manager Sparky Anderson left the club on the direction of team doctor Clarence Livingood due to physical exhaustion. Livingood told the press that Anderson was suffering from extreme stress to the point where he was unable to sleep. At the time, the Tigers were 14-24, last place in the American League East and had the worst record in Major League Baseball. Coach Dick Tracewski was named interim manager in Anderson’s absence.

May 23:   Pitcher Jack Morris is placed on the disabled list for the first time in his career. Morris had complained of soreness following a 7-3 loss to the Cleveland Indians on May 22. Morris became the fourth Tiger pitcher to be placed on the DL so far this season. Morris was in the midst of the worst start of his career with a 2-7 record with a 4.94 ERA. To replace him on the roster, the Tigers called up pitcher Mike Schwabe from AA London.

July 
July 6: Relief pitcher Mike Henneman is the only Tiger to be named to the American League All Star team. At the announcement of his selection, Henneman is 5-2 with 2 saves and a 3.21 ERA. Despite eight pitchers appearing in the game, Henneman and Chuck Finley of the California Angels do not see action.

August  
August 19: In the early morning hours, pitcher Charles Hudson, driving drunk, slammed his mother in-law’s Mercury Cougar into a telephone pole in the Detroit suburb of Farmington Hills, Michigan. He spent a day and a half in intensive care with a broken left leg, right ankle and his right knee needed reconstructive surgery. A month later, Hudson was sentenced to one year’s probation after pleading guilty to driving while impaired. Investigators said his blood alcohol level the night of the accident was 0.11. Under Michigan law, 0.10 was considered the legal limit.

Hudson would later discuss how he began to drink as he struggled in his baseball career. He would not pitch in the major leagues again and the Tigers released him in November 1989.

October 
October 1: The Tigers defeat the New York Yankees at Yankee Stadium 5-3. The victory prevents the Tigers from tying the then-franchise record of 104 losses in a season.

Notable transactions
 May 19, 1989: Rick Schu was purchased by the Tigers from the Baltimore Orioles. Chris Brown (baseball) was waived by the Tigers. 
 June 16, 1989: Pat Sheridan was traded by the Tigers to the San Francisco Giants for Tracy Jones.
 August 17, 1989: Keith Atherton was signed as a free agent with the Detroit Tigers.

Season standings

Record vs. opponents

Roster

Player stats

Batting

Starters by position
Note: Pos = Position; G = Games played; AB = At bats; H = Hits; Avg. = Batting average; HR = Home runs; RBI = Runs batted in

Other batters
Note: G = Games played; AB = At bats; H = Hits; Avg. = Batting average; HR = Home runs; RBI = Runs batted in

Pitching

Starting pitchers
Note: G = Games pitched; IP = Innings pitched; W = Wins; L = Losses; ERA = Earned run average; SO = Strikeouts

Other pitchers
Note: G = Games pitched; IP = Innings pitched; W = Wins; L = Losses; ERA = Earned run average; SO = Strikeouts

Relief pitchers
Note: G = Games pitched; W = Wins; L = Losses; SV = Saves; ERA = Earned run average; SO = Strikeouts

Farm system

<ref>Johnson, Lloyd, and Wolff, Miles, ed., The Encyclopedia of Minor League Baseball". Durham, North Carolina: Baseball America, 1997</ref>

Notes

References

1989 Detroit Tigers season at Baseball Reference''
Tigers at Baseball Almanac

Detroit Tigers seasons
Detroit Tigers season
Detroit Tiger
1989 in Detroit